"Opiate" is a song by Tool and the title track from their debut EP recorded by producer Sylvia Massy at Sound City Studios in 1991. "Opiate" serves as the final track of the Opiate EP and contains the hidden track, "The Gaping Lotus Experience".

Live performances
"Opiate" has held a regular position on Tool's concert setlist since 1992. In 1994, it was often played back-to-back with "Flood", transitioning smoothly between songs and skipping the lengthy "Flood" intro. By 1996, "Opiate" would often serve as the penultimate song of concerts, preceding "Ænema". Maynard James Keenan has dedicated the song to psychologist and author Timothy Leary on multiple occasions and to former Tool bassist Paul D'Amour on others, referring to him as "Paul of Love".

Various musicians have collaborated with Tool in performing "Opiate" live. Examples include Layne Staley in 1993 and '94, Tricky in 2001, and Heitham Al-Sayed in 2006. Nu metal band Limp Bizkit has also been known to have covered the song live.

Opiate2
"Opiate" was re-recorded and released as "Opiate2" or "Opiate Squared" on March 1, 2022. It is almost four minutes longer than the original and includes the same lyrics as the live version, plus the extended instrumental midsection. A Blu-ray short film directed by Dominic Hailstone was released on March 18 to commemorate the EP's 30th anniversary. The commentary is provided by BenDeLaCreme and Jinkx Monsoon of RuPaul's Drag Race.

Charts

Personnel
Tool
Maynard James Keenan – vocals
Adam Jones – guitar, synthesizer (Opiate2)
Paul D'Amour – bass guitar
Danny Carey – drums
Justin Chancellor – bass guitar (Opiate2)

Technical personnel
Sylvia Massy – production
Steve Hansgen – production
 Tool - production (Opiate2)
 Toshi Kasai - engineering (Opiate2)
 "Evil" Joe Barresi – mixing (Opiate2)
 Bob Ludwig - mastering (Opiate2)

References

1992 songs
Songs critical of religion
Tool (band) songs
Songs written by Maynard James Keenan
Songs written by Danny Carey
Songs written by Paul D'Amour
Songs written by Adam Jones (musician)